Classic Gold 1332 was a British radio station broadcasting to the Peterborough area on 1332 kHz AM and DAB digital radio. It also was available around Cambridge on DAB digital radio. It was part of the Classic Gold Digital Network which was owned by GCap and was the sister station of 102.7 Hereward FM. Its studios were based in the Queensgate Centre, Peterborough.

History

The station was launched on 10 July 1980, as Hereward Radio, broadcasting on 102.7 FM and 1332 AM. On 14 April 1992 the station split its AM and FM frequencies, with 102.7 Hereward FM broadcasting on 102.7 FM and The Worlds Greatest Music Station or WGMS launching on 1332 AM. WGMS was short-lived, as around 1994, it was bought by the GWR Group and re-branded as Classic Gold 1332. Owing to going over the limit of the number of stations a group can own, the GWR Group had to sell all of their "Classic Gold" stations. They were purchased by the UBC Media Group, although GWR did keep a 20% stake in the brand of stations.

Format

Classic Gold 1332 played the best songs from the 1960s through to the present day, with a larger focus on the 1960s to the 1980s. It was networked for 20 hours a day during the week, with the single local show presented by Pete Revell. Network shows had local elements broadcast at selected intervals. According to the RAJAR results for the period ending December 2006 the station had 36,000 listeners and a 2.9% market share in its area.

On 3 August 2007, all Classic Gold  stations were rebranded as simply Gold. This followed the GCap Media's purchase of the Classic Gold network, and the merging of the merger between the Capital Gold and Classic Gold networks.

Network programmes

 The Even Tastier Breakfast
 The Graham Rogers Morning Show
 Classic Gold Drivetime (local programme)
 Paul Baker's Evening Show
 Classic Gold Late Night
 The Retro Countdown
 Classic Gold Albums

Network presenters

 Paul Baker
 Tony Blackburn
 Paul Burnett
 Matthew Hardy
 Erika North
 Gary Crowley
 Graham Rogers
 Sandy Warr
 Trevor Dann
 Mark Dennison
 Chris Hawkins

Past network presenters

 Jimmy Savile
 Dave Lee Travis
 Johnnie Walker
 Mike Read
 Noddy Holder
 David Hamilton
 Simon Bates
 Emperor Rosko

External links
 Classic Gold website
 History of local radio in Cambridgeshire

References

GCap Media
Radio stations in Cambridgeshire and Peterborough
Radio stations established in 1992
Defunct radio stations in the United Kingdom